Vienna sausage (Viennese/Austrian German: Frankfurter Würstel or Würstl; Swiss German: Wienerli; Swabian: Wienerle or Saitenwurst) is a thin parboiled sausage traditionally made of pork and beef in a casing of sheep's intestine, then given a low temperature smoking. The word Wiener is German for Viennese. In Austria, the term "Wiener" is uncommon for this food item, which instead is usually called Frankfurter Würstl.

Europe
In some European countries, cooked and often smoked wiener sausages bought fresh from supermarkets, delicatessens and butcher shops may be called by a name (such as in German or French) which translates in English as "Vienna sausage." Traditionally, they are made from cured pork, but in Eastern and Southern Europe, sausages made from chicken or turkey are more common; these are also sold in places with a significant population of people who do not eat pork for religious reasons. Wieners sold in Europe have a taste and texture very much like North American hot dogs, but are usually longer and somewhat thinner, with a very light, edible casing. European Vienna sausages served hot in a long bun with condiments are often called "hot dogs," referring to the long sandwich as a whole. A spiced, paprika-rich look-alike of Vienna sausage is known as debrecener.

North America
After having been brought to North America by European immigrants, "Vienna sausage" came to mean only smaller and much shorter smoked and canned wieners, rather than link sausage, beginning about 1903. However, they have no federal standard of identity. North American vienna sausages are made similarly to pork wieners, finely ground to a paste consistency and mixed with salt and various spices, such as cloves, coriander, nutmeg, garlic powder, onion powder and finely ground, dry red pepper. The sausages are stuffed into a long casing, sometimes smoked, always thoroughly cooked and beginning in the 1950s, the casings were removed. The sausages are cut into short segments for canning and cooking. They are available plain (in gelatin, similar to aspic) or with a variety of flavorings, such as smoke, mustard, chili, or barbecue sauces. Consumption of Vienna sausages peaked in the 1940s to 1970s but has declined since then.

See also 

 Canned food
 Frankfurter Würstchen
 Cervelat
 Hot dog variations
 List of sausages
 List of smoked foods
 Potted meat food product

References

External links
 

Canned meat
Austrian sausages
German sausages
Smoked meat
American cuisine
Cooked sausages